Phullan, India  is a small village that is located between Ratia and Fatehabad established around 1860–1870. The population of Phullan is around 7800–8000. It is approximately 18 km from Fatehabad and 10 km from Ratia. The population includes many Jat gotras, such as the Sihag, Thalor, Babal, Maiya, Dahiya, Manglauda, Karwasra, Garhwal, Fageria, Jewliya,Jangra,Jhajhra, Dhaka, Dheru, Tandi, Jhakar, koont and Mehla. Harijan, Nayak are among the backward classes living in the village.

The village got its name "Phullan" from the flowers which were present at the entrance of the village.

See also

 List of villages in Fatehabad district

References

Villages in Fatehabad district